Tokyo Xtreme Racer DRIFT 2 (known as Kaido Battle: Touge no Densetsu (lit. Kaido: Legend of the Mountain Pass) in Japan and Kaido Racer 2 in Europe and Australia) is a racing simulator by Genki that was released in 2005. It is the third installment in the Kaido Battle series, being a sequel to Kaidō Battle 2: Chain Reaction (known as Kaido Racer in Europe and Australia), and it borrows heavily to the influential Shutokou Battle series created by the same company.

Overview
The game is about touge racing, which relies heavily on drift skills made popular in the western culture during the 2000s by Initial D and The Fast and the Furious: Tokyo Drift, and is divided in both daytime and nighttime. The player can buy a used or new stock car, tune it with aero and engine parts, get sponsorships and challenge other racers in nocturnal illegal gambling touge racing or perform downhill / uphill time attack in daytime. Available cars become more and more powerful from the basic K-car, minitruck, 1600cc compact to the 3000cc sports car. Vehicle list features licensed Japanese and European import cars.

Gameplay

Career

The career mode (or Conquest mode in the game as it's called) features a single driver (with name provided by the player, default name is "k_taro") on his quest to become the best racer in all the Osaka area. The player starts with around ¥2,500,000 (or around $23,000) to buy a car (more than the previous game, Kaido Battle 2, which had only ¥2,200,000 to start and ¥1,500,000 in the first). The Conquest mode has been significantly changed, with several new real-life locations of races being present in the game as of course, several new being presented in the game. Hakone and Haruna return from the original game, while several new locations, like Shiga Kusatsu, Hiroshima, Nikko and Mount Rokkō (divided into two roads, Ura and Omote) are new roads to race, and some of them being omitted from the game.

With the original tracks in the game, a new option in the game has been made: Short Courses. There are only three short courses in the game, and as the name says, they are much shorter than the long course tracks. They cannot be simply unlocked by passing the Conquest mode, but rather by winning the special invitation by beating the significant opponent in the game and winning a number of prizes to be allowed to participate. Several sponsors and many high-stakes drivers are on short courses, and several drivers from the original Tokyo Extreme Racer are featured in short courses. Also, short courses are only open during the day and during the good weather.

Tuning of the car has been significantly changed as well. The sequel features vinyls which can be put on the car, although the sticker scheme has been changed and now only one sticker of the team can be applied to the car. Several new body changes were made, with the ability to add mudflaps, rally bonnets and spoilers, as well as carbon trunks and hoods. As with the original game, performance can be tuned up, although now there is a different mod of engine tuning in which you pick parts from different manufactures to help tune the car to the maximum amount of power. The same goes with Turbo tuning, and now NA engines can be converted to Turbo and also shifted back to NA engines (although cars with stock Turbo cannot be converted to NA engines).

As with the original, the goal is to defeat all Slashers (bosses of roads) to win the game. Although, some new tweaks have been made. For instance, a road only has one Slasher now, and number of Tricky drivers (more powerful drivers serving as prelude to a Slasher) have been added. Some drivers from the previous games have been now made Slashers, while some of them changed locations (for instance, Haruna Guardian now has a new car and is a Slasher, while the previous Haruna Slasher Lonely Wanderer is now an Akagi slasher). Slashers drive special vehicles with unique body kits, paint and stickers. In the original release, it's possible to "recreate" Slashers' cars. In Conquest mode, player also has the ability to unlock some special cars as well to buy them, which have custom body kits, paint job, vinyls and rims. Every driver in the game has its own biography (which is mostly comical), a car and car's specs. A difference from the previous game is that in the previous game, only bets were with special car parts or a new car, but in this game all races feature bets, with some of them featuring parts or vehicles.

Category races have been changed as well, with three types of them: Standard Races, Gymkhana and Advanced Races. Standard races are CA challenges which allows the player to progress through levels, which in turn allows the player to race in Advanced Races. Advanced Races have special medal prizes, which can unlock some new equipment, new cars and also short courses. Gymkhana is different from the both, instead featuring a parking lot with cones, with both TA and CA challenges for Gymkhana racing.

With the same plot as the original game had, some differences have been made. For instance, a new plot was designed featuring Thirteen Devils and Kingdom Twelve. Thirteen Devils is a racing team from Tokyo that has arrived on highways of Japan to conquer all the major courses. They are a group of 13 drivers with high-performance cars, with all of them having a distinctive yellow paint job and custom vinyls. Opposed to them are Kingdom Twelve, a group of 12 professional racers who race to "protect" the highway drivers from city racers, and they have arrived to combat Thirteen Devils, and they have custom vinyls and high-end performance cars. The player, during the game, will have an opportunity to race drivers from both groups, and they are regularly mentioned during the game via messaging. Later, a secret will be revealed at the end of the staff credits.

The game features 4 Stages through the game. As Slashers are beaten and new locations are unlocked, new cars, sponsors and car parts are unlocked. Each Stage (except Stage 1 and Stage 4, which has only two locations) features three locations, and usually only one has to be beaten in order to advance to the next Stage, although more hardcore gamers will tend to conquer all locations at the Stage to achieve 100% in the game and unlock new cars, car parts, etc.

Slashers & Last bosses

1st Stage :
-Kazuhiko Ooaza, aka MMC Ooaza (Mr. Mitsu in EU & US version) : A regular café patron who loves Mitsubishi cars, he's a well-known fixture in Hakone. He has decent technique, but it was his upstanding character above all else that made him a leader in Hakone. His vaunted FTO is tuned almost to perfection, and he continues to thwart the ambitions of those racers who would conquer Hakone. (Note : his FTO is equipped with a L4 engine instead of a V6).

- Yūya Takuma, aka World Supremacy (Dominator in EU & US version) : He holds numerous records in Hiroshima-Noroyama. But he's not very socially adept; he doesn't team up often, and he doesn't talk about himself to other people much. But he's incredibly passionate about racing, training rigorously even on Sunday mornings in his Sileighty when not many people are out.

2nd Stage :

-Shin'ichi Tamaki (Shinichi Tamashiro in US & EU version), aka Haruna Guardian (Guardian in EU & US version) : After losing once to a racer that suddenly appeared out of nowhere, he realized how vulnerable his position was. He changed his machine from a Galant VR-4 to a Lancer Evolution IV and made a fresh start. His old car was a pretty nice ride, but it was nothing compared to this Lancer. And so began the pursuit of the new Haruna Guardians...

-Eiji Kurihara, aka Lonely Wanderer (Eternal Wanderer in EU & US version) : It was a long time ago, but the name "Kurihara" used to strike fear into the hearts of racers in Haruna. Then a new champion suddenly appeared, and Kurihara moved here to Akagi. Since then, countless races have made him virtually unbeatable in Akagi. His car, a Supra JZA80, is starting to show its age.

-Masaya Tendō, aka Metal Wizard (Alchemist in EU & US version) : He used to be fairly well known on the highway course at Omote Rokko, but he never really stood out. Then one day, Tendō suddenly and unexpectedly disappeared from Omote Rokko - only to reappear as the top racer in his NSX-R NA2 on the new course : Ura Rokko.

3rd Stage :

-Shū Asuka, aka Final Leg (Last Leg in EU & US version) : Asuka is into rally racing, and he's traded in his old Lancer Evolution VIII for the more advanced Lancer Evolution VIII MR. This may not seem like a very big step up, but in the able hands of Asuka, who has always been good at handling powerful cars like this, the difference is obvious. His racing is tighter than ever.

-Chōmei Jō (Nagaaki Jyo in US & EU version), aka New Moon : For the time being, he's the fastest racer on the new Shiga Kusatsu course. He thinks he's cool because he drives an ordinary FR 25 GT-S instead of a GT-R, but no one else seems to think so. Despite his obnoxious personality, he's got pretty good technique.

-Hiroyuki Okamoto, aka Global Winner (True Champion in EU & US version) : Okamoto is that rarest of rarities : a samuraï racer. He drives only the most expensive, most prestigious cars, like his RS6. And his technique is even better than it used to be. Maybe it's because he's smarter than the rest of us...

4th Stage :

-Kyōichi Imaizumi, the Absolute Emperor, aka Yeti Fang : Once known as the fastest man in Zao, he was knocked from his perch one day by a new racer who made it look easy against his Clio V6 Phase 2. Since then, there's been something truly frightening in Imaizumi's racing. Even people who used to hang out with say they're afraid to talk to him now. One day soon, the storm is going to hit.

-Tatsu Zōshigaya, the Miracles Summit, aka Supremacy Murder (Reign Supreme in US & EU version) : When Emotional King suddenly disappeared from Aso, in his place came a next racing phenomenon :  Zōshigaya, all of 19 years old. With his natural racing instincts and technique and his car, a black Impreza Rally Car Prototype, in just 3 months there was no one left who could beat him. He's currently focused on creating the perfect line.

Final Stage :

-Taiju Kōkami (Hiroki Koukami in US & EU version), the Emotional King, aka Forever Knights (Blackout in US & EU version) : Once the fastest man in Aso - no, the fastest man on ANY course (since he is the hero in Kaido Battle / Tokyo Xtreme Racer Drift) - the only person who could rival Kōkami was Kōkami himself. Realizing this, he disappeared completely from the night battle world. He show no interest in the up-and-coming talents of the racing world, focusing solely on improving himself and his car, his black-red Lancer Evolution III GSR. His racing style is truly emotional.

Vehicles

Number of vehicles in the game has been raised significantly, and the game features 30 to 40 cars more than the previous game. They range from K-cars and small pick-up trucks to hatchbacks and 4-door sedans to more powerful vehicles. The game features Japanese and European cars in the game, although European cars are less used and mostly inferior to the Japanese ones, although some of them (for instance, Volkswagen Golf IV) are in performance very superior to Japanese cars. There are also several parodies of cars from anime and manga titles like Initial D, Wangan Midnight and Over Rev! with different colors. Unlike past games in the franchise, there are no cars from American manufacturers.

Game modes

The game features many new modes of racing, many of which appear in the Conquest mode:

Standard Challenges

SP challenge: Standard race between two rivals, but it features a health bar which drains power out of the losing one's car if he is behind, and the further the winner is from the loser, the faster the bar will drain, and as such, the race can be won also by getting fast out of range of the opponent, not just crossing the finish line first. The health bar can drastically be drained if the two cars collide with each other or they bump into walls.
SA challenge: Togue race between the two rivals, with the player at the back. This race doesn't feature a meter, but the race can be won if one rival gets too far ahead (usually 104.3 feet ahead).

+TF challenge: Togue race between the two rivals, only the player is at the front and he has to finish the race first to win. Also doesn't feature a meter.

TA challenge: Standard Time attack challenge, with the object being beating the rival's record in the race.
CA challenge: Time attack, but it also features a drift mode in which the player has to beat the rival's time record and also score more drift points than the rival in order to win the race.
TAC challenge: Just like the regular time attack challenge, but the driver also has a health bar that will be reduced if the player bumps with walls.
CAT challenge: A drift challenge, in which the player has to score a significant number of points on each turn, and the player will automatically lose if bumping walls or failing to score the ordered number of points.

Category Races

Category races were also featured in the original game, and also return here with some changes:

Category race: The object of the race is to score a number of points given through drifting so the player can win the money (which increases if the player has sponsor stickers on the car). The drifts can score a combo which increases in every drift as long as the player scores more than 1000 points in each section, and as the combo increases, number of points will also be increased with each section, but the combo can end if the player scores less than 1000 points or bumps a wall, ending the drift.
Gymkhana: A new option in the game, which is divided into TA and CA challenges. TA challenge is to pass a given route through the cones in the ordered time to win the event, while the CA challenge also features a number of points that have to be scored with the given amount of time. Gymkhana features 10 different routes that get harder by the event, although there is no difference between TA and CA routes. In Conquest mode, every city features identical routes, except that as the player progresses through Stages and locations, Gymkhana routes have the given time limit reduced and number of points raised, making it more difficult, but the cash prize increases as well.
Advanced races: A new option of the game, they are unlocked with solving the Conquest mode and are unique as a player needs to have a specific type of engine or a car brand in order to enter the race, as well as the level of skill which is progressed as Category races are won. Each destination has unique events, and have much bigger cash prizes and also unlock special medals.

Reception

The game was met with very mixed reception upon release, as GameRankings gave it a score of 52.12%, while Metacritic gave it 46 out of 100.
Although, the game has a large, yet spread out fan base among car enthusiast as the style of racing displayed (Drifting) and the locations (Mountain, Country Roads) gave them the opportunity to safely experience the Japanese street racing culture that was prevalent during the 1980s up to present day.
This game also influenced many car racing players and software programmers to modify and or create games that involve the racing style commonly referred to as "Touge".

References

External links
 Official Japanese website

2005 video games
Genki (company) games
PlayStation 2 games
PlayStation 2-only games
Tokyo Xtreme Racer
Video game sequels
Video games developed in Japan